

QI05A Horse

QI05AA Inactivated viral vaccines
QI05AA01 Equine influenza virus
QI05AA03 Equine rhinopneumonitis virus + equine reovirus + equine influenza virus
QI05AA04 Equine rhinopneumonitis virus + equine influenza virus
QI05AA05 Equine rhinopneumonitis virus
QI05AA06 Equine reovirus
QI05AA07 Equine arteritis virus
QI05AA08 Equine parapox virus
QI05AA09 Equine rotavirus
QI05AA10 West nile virus
QI05AA11 Equine rhinopneumonitis virus + equine abortion virus

QI05AB Inactivated bacterial vaccines (including mycoplasma, toxoid and chlamydia)
QI05AB01 Streptococcus
QI05AB02 Actinobacillus + escherichia + salmonella + streptococcus
QI05AB03 Clostridium

QI05AC Inactivated bacterial vaccines and antisera
Empty group

QI05AD Live viral vaccines
QI05AD01 Equine rhinopneumonitis virus
QI05AD02 Equine influenza virus

QI05AE Live bacterial vaccines
Empty group

QI05AF Live bacterial and viral vaccines
Empty group

QI05AG Live and inactivated bacterial vaccines
Empty group

QI05AH Live and inactivated viral vaccines
Empty group

QI05AI Live viral and inactivated bacterial vaccines
QI05AI01 Equine influenza virus + clostridium

QI05AJ Live and inactivated viral and bacterial vaccines
Empty group

QI05AK Inactivated viral and live bacterial vaccines
Empty group

QI05AL Inactivated viral and inactivated bacterial vaccines
QI05AL01 Equine influenza virus + clostridium

QI05AM Antisera, immunoglobulin preparations, and antitoxins
QI05AM01 Clostridium antiserum
QI05AM02 Antilipopolysacharide antiserum
QI05AM03 Actinobacillus antiserum + escherichia antiserum + salmonella antiserum + streptococcus antiserum

QI05AN Live parasitic vaccines
Empty group

QI05AO Inactivated parasitic vaccines
Empty group

QI05AP Live fungal vaccines
QI05AP01 Trichophyton

QI05AQ Inactivated fungal vaccines
QI05AQ01 Trichophyton
QI05AQ02 Trichophyton + microsporum

QI05AR In vivo diagnostic preparations
QI05AR01 Mallein

QI05AS Allergens
Empty group

QI05AT Colostrum preparations and substitutes
Empty group

QI05AU Other live vaccines
Empty group

QI05AV Other inactivated vaccines
Empty group

QI05AX Other immunologicals
QI05AX01 Parapox ovis virus, inactivated
QI05AX02 Propionibacterium acnes, inactivated

QI05B Azinine/donkey

Empty group

QI05C Hybride

Empty group

QI05X Equidae, others

Empty group

References

I05